The 1964 Hackney Council election took place on 7 May 1964 to elect members of Hackney London Borough Council in London, England. The whole council was up for election and the Labour party gained control of the council.

Background
These elections were the first to the newly formed borough. Previously elections had taken place in the Metropolitan Borough of Hackney, Metropolitan Borough of Shoreditch and Metropolitan Borough of Stoke Newington. These boroughs were joined to form the new London Borough of Hackney by the London Government Act 1963.

A total of 137 candidates stood in the election for the 60 seats being contested across 20 wards. 9 seats in three wards went unopposed. These included a full slate from the Labour party, while the Conservative and Liberal parties stood 36 and 32 respectively. Other candidates included 8 from the Communist party and 1 Independent Labour. There were 11 three-seat wards, 5 two-seat wards, 3 four-seat wards and 1 five-seat ward.

This election had aldermen as well as directly elected councillors.  Labour got all 10 aldermen.

The Council was elected in 1964 as a "shadow authority" but did not start operations until 1 April 1965.

Election result
The results saw Labour gain the new council after winning all 60 seats. Overall turnout in the election was 16.3%. This turnout included 243 postal votes.

Ward results

References

1964
1964 London Borough council elections